"Yolo" is a song performed by Congolese-French singer and rapper Gims, released on 28 August 2020. The song is the first single from the album Le Fléau. It is written by Gims, composed by Boumidjal X. It was released on 28 August 2020 the first single from the album Le Fléau under the labels Play Two, Chahawat and Sony Music.

Yolo is inspired by the Congolese origins of Gims. The title is none other than the name of his childhood neighborhood in Kinshasa in the Democratic Republic of the Congo.

Music video 
The video clip released on 2 September 2020. The clip has over 19,727,429 views to date.

Charts

Release history

References 

2020 songs
2020 singles
French songs
Gims songs
Songs written by Gims